"U & Mi" is a 1991 song by Sweden-based musician and producer Dr Alban, released as the third single from his debut album, Hello Afrika (1990). It is the follow-up to his very successful single, "No Coke" and was a notable hit in several countries. Produced by Denniz Pop, who also co-wrote it with Dr. Alban, it became a top 10 hit in Finland, Portugal and Switzerland, and a top 20 hit in Austria, Germany, Spain and Sweden. A music video was also produced to promote the single.

Critical reception
Pan-European magazine Music & Media commented, "New recipe from the same private practice. For the follow-up to Hello Afrika and No Coke the Swedish bush doctor has added a spoonful of Real Milli Vanilli to his magic potion. Top-40 programmers must take a shot of it."

Track listing
 7" single, Sweden (1991)   
"U & Mi" (The 7" Radiomix)
"U & Mi" (The 7" Dancemix)

 12" single, Sweden (1991)   
"U & Mi" (The 12" Dancemix) – 5:13
"U & Mi" (The 7" Radiomix) – 3:27
"U & Mi" (The Gregorian Mix) – 4:18
"U & Mi" (The Gregorian Dub) – 4:00                   
"U & Mi" (The Techno Mix) – 7:12

 CD maxi, Germany (1991)   
"U & Mi" (Eee-Motion Mix) – 6:30
"U & Mi" (Swe&Me Mix) – 5:11
"U & Mi" (Swe-Tech Mix) – 7:11

Charts

References

 

1991 singles
1991 songs
Dr. Alban songs
English-language Swedish songs
Logic Records singles
Song recordings produced by Denniz Pop
Songs written by Denniz Pop
Songs written by Dr. Alban